Jonathan may refer to:

Jonathan (name), a masculine given name

Media 
Jonathan (1970 film), a German film directed by Hans W. Geißendörfer
Jonathan (2016 film), a German film directed by Piotr J. Lewandowski
Jonathan (2018 film), an American film directed by Bill Oliver
Jonathan (Buffy comic), a 2001 comic book based on the Buffy the Vampire Slayer television series
Jonathan (TV show), a Welsh-language television show hosted by ex-rugby player Jonathan Davies

People and biblical figures

Bible
Jonathan (1 Samuel), son of King Saul of Israel and friend of David, in the Books of Samuel
Jonathan (Judges), in the Book of Judges
Jonathan (son of Abiathar), in 2 Samuel and 1 Kings

Judaism
Jonathan Apphus, fifth son of Mattathias and leader of the Hasmonean dynasty of Judea from 161 to 143 BCE
Rabbi Jonathan, 2nd century
Jonathan (High Priest), a High Priest of Israel in the 1st century

Footballers

Jonathan (footballer, born 1991)
Jonathan (footballer, born 1992)
Jonathan (footballer, born 1998)
Jonathan (footballer, born 1999)

Other
Jonathan (apple), a variety of apple
"Jonathan" (song), a 2015 song by French singer and songwriter Christine and the Queens featuring Perfume Genius
Jonathan (tortoise), a Seychelles Giant tortoise that lives on the island of St Helena
Jonathan Island, a privately owned island off the coast of Narragansett, Rhode Island, US
Jonathan, Minnesota, the "new town" development in Chaska, Minnesota, US
Jonathan the Husky, the mascot of the University of Connecticut
Jonathan Joestar, the main protagonist of the first part of the Japanese manga series Jojo's Bizarre Adventure

See also 
Johnathan, a related given name
Hovnatanian, an Armenian family whose name derives from the equivalent of Jonathan

Jonatan
Jonathas